Jagdishpur is a constituency of the Uttar Pradesh Legislative Assembly covering the city of Jagdishpur in the Amethi district of Uttar Pradesh, India.

Jagdishpur is one of five assembly constituencies in the Amethi Lok Sabha constituency. Since 2008, this assembly constituency is numbered 184 amongst 403 constituencies.

Members of Vidhan Sabha
 1969 : Ram Sevak (Jana Sangh) 
 1974 : Ram Sevak (Congress)
 1977 : Ram Pher Kori (Janata Party) 
 1980 : Ram Sevak (Congress - Indira)
 1985 : Ram Sevak (Congress)
 1989 : Ram Sevak (Congress)
 1991 : Ram Sevak (Congress)   
 1993 : Nand Lal (Samajwadi)  
 1996 : Ram Lakhan (BJP) 
 2007 : Ram Sevak (Congress)
 2012 : Radhe Shyam (SP)  
 2017 : Suresh Kumar (BJP)

Election results

2022

2017
Bharatiya Janta Party candidate Suresh Kumar won in last Assembly election of 2017 Uttar Pradesh Legislative Elections defeating Indian National Congress candidate Radhe Shyam by a margin of 16,600 votes.
 Suresh Kumar (Bharatiya Janata Party) : 84,219 votes 
 Radhey Shyam Dhobi (Indian National Congress) : 67,619 
 Jag dutt (Bahujan Samaj Party) : 31338

1993 Vidhan Sabha
 Nand Lal (Samajwadi Party) : 37,511 votes
 Daulat Ram (BJP) : 31,161
 Ram Sewak S/o Bhagwandin (Congress) : 10537

1969 Election
 Ram Sewak (BJS) : 13,812 votes  
 Inder Pal (INC) : 9774

References

External links
 

Assembly constituencies of Uttar Pradesh
Amethi district